Crooks Springs is an unincorporated community in southern St. Clair County, in the U.S. state of Missouri. The community is on Allen Branch a tributary of the Sac River approximately twelve miles southwest of Osceola.

The community has the name of Lee Crook, the proprietor of a destination spa near the original town site.

References

Unincorporated communities in St. Clair County, Missouri
Unincorporated communities in Missouri